F45 may refer to:

Ships 
 , a Niterói-class frigate of the Brazilian Navy
 , an armed merchant cruiser of the Royal Navy
 , a K-class frigate of the Royal Navy
 , a Leander-class frigate of the Royal Navy
 , a Talwar-class frigate of the Indian Navy

Airplanes 
 Firecatcher F-45, a single-turboprop aircraft designed for aerial firefighting, air freight and commuter airlines.

Other uses 
 BMW 2 Series (F45), an automobile
 EMD F45, an American diesel-electric locomotive
 F45 Training, an Australian multinational chain of fitness clubs
 Fairchild 45, a rare American 1930s vintage aircraft
 Firecatcher F-45, a New Zealand civil utility aircraft
 North Palm Beach County General Aviation Airport, in Florida (location identifier: F45)
 Somatic symptom disorder (medical classification code: F45)